Tourism is  one of an economic contributor to the union territory of Ladakh in Northern India. The union territory is sandwiched between the Karakoram mountain range to the north and the Himalayas to the south and is situated at the height of 11,400 ft. Ladakh is composed of the Leh and Kargil districts. The region contains prominent Buddhist sites and has an ecotourism industry.

Transport

The two roads into the area from outside are the Zoji-La Pass and Kargil route from Srinagar District in the Kashmir Valley, and the high altitude Manali-Leh Highway from Himachal Pradesh. The Manali-Leh road is open only from May or June to October or November when snow is cleared from several passes. The Srinagar-Leh road is open from April or May to November or December and is generally blocked by snow through the winter only at Zoji La Pass.

Kushok Bakula Rimpochee Airport at Leh has flights from Delhi year-round on Indigo, Vistara, GoFirst, and Air India. Air India also operates weekly flights to Jammu and Srinagar.

Roads within Ladakh, except to Zangskar, are open all year round. Khardong-La Pass to Nubra can get closed by snow for several days in winter and spring. Chang-La pass to Pangong Lake rarely closes.

Buses serve the whole area from Leh and Kargil towns. Taxis are available in Leh and Kargil as well as in block headquarters like Tangtse, Diskit, and Khalsa. Shared taxis to Nubra, Kargil, Srinagar, and Zanskar leave Leh in the early morning.

The nearest railhead is Udhampur connected with all major cities and towns in India.

Permits and borders

No special permit is required to visit most of Ladakh, including Leh and Kargil towns. Permits are required for all tourists to visit the "Inner Line" areas, i.e. Nubra Valley; Panggong Lake and the Durbuk Block that it lies in (i.e. north of the Changla Pass); Tso-Moriri and Tsokar Lakes and the area along the Indus River east of Upshi; and Dha-hanu and the area along the Indus River northwest of Khalatse.

Permits are not available for foreigners to go to the far reaches of each of the areas close to the borders (or Line of Control, etc.) with Pakistan and China. For example, foreigners can go to the edge of Panggong Lake and Maan and Merak villages, but not along the edge of it to Phobrang or Chushul villages; they cannot proceed east up the Indus from the Mahe Bridge; and in Nubra, they can only go as far as Panamik to the north and Turtuk to the west.

There are no open border crossings to the neighbouring Tibet Autonomous Region 
and Xinxiang, administered by China, or to Gilgit-Baltistan, administered by Pakistan.

Tourist places

Places

Major places

Among the places of tourist interest include Leh, Drass valley, Razi khar (Chiktan Khar), Suru valley, Kargil, Zangskar, Zangla, Rangdum, Padum, Phukthal, Sani Monastery, Stongdey, Shyok Valley, Sankoo, Salt Valley., Markha valley, Ladakh monastery trek, South Zangskar, Trans-Zangskar Expedition, Spiti to Ladakh, Spiti to Pitok to Hemis, Rupshu, the Great Salt lakes, Chadar Ice trek

Leh

 
The Leh Palace, which is situated behind the main market has eight stories and is similar to the Potala Palace of Lhasa and still belongs to the royal family of Ladakh. Just ahead of the palace is the Chamba Temple, which is a one roomed shrine that has a large icon of Maitreya, the Buddha to come. Also in the bazaar, at the top of the street, one can see the Jama Masjid. This has been painted in green and white colour. Another place to visit is the Sankar Gompa, which is situated in the city and is one of the oldest structures here. At one time, this monastery only welcomes a maximum of twenty monks.

Regions of Ladakh

Ladakh is divided into 2 areas: "East Ladakh" administered by India and "West Ladakh" administered by Pakistan.

Eastern Ladakh held by India is further subdivided in three regions: Western, Central and Eastern areas of East Ladakh.

Western area of East Ladakh

Kargil and Leh are main cities in this region.

The Razi Khar (Chiktan kahr/Chiktan Palace), which is situated 76 km from Kargil and 180 km from Leh is situated on the highway from Kargil to Leh, and is the first Palace of the then ruler Thatha Khan.

In the northern areas, civilians and tourists are allowed to travel only up to Shyok village of 
Durbuk tehsil. It has geostrategic importance as it is the last Indian village on the 235 km long Darbuk–Shyok–DBO Road in the north which connects it to Daulat Beg Oldi (DBO) military post 225 km away on the China border. Syok to BDO area is also called Sub-Sector North (SSN) by the Indian Military. Sasoma–Saser La Road will provide alternative connectivity to DBO.

Central area of East Ladakh 
Chushul, where access by road is permitted without permit, lies in the north area of central Ladakh.

The Thikse Monastery is the largest monastery in central Ladakh and is primarily known for its statue of Maitreya in its Maitreya Temple. This statue is 15 m (49 ft) high and the largest such statue in Ladakh. The Buddha is unusually portrayed as seated in the lotus position rather than his usual representations as standing or in a sitting posture on a high throne.

Eastern area of East Ladakh 

Main areas are Karzok and Hanle. Travel from Hanley to Demchok is not permitted for the civilians and tourists, only army contractors are allowed with permission from the Indian Army.

Major routes

Road routes

In 2018, following 5 road routes were opened for the tourists by the Government of India (GoI), all of these are located above the altitude of 14,000 ft, and the maximum limit of travel permit was raised from 7 days to 15 days:

 Karzok-Nurbo-Sumdo-Parangla-Kaza road
 Merak, Ladakh-Loma Bend road
 Chushul-Kartsangla-Mahe, Ladakh road
 Durbuk-Shachu-Tharuk-Sato Kargyam-Parma-Erath, Ladakh-Chushul-Loma, Ladakh-Hanle road
 Agham, Ladakh-Shyok-Durbuk road

Trekking routes

 
Treks include Manali to Ladakh, the Nubra valley, Pangong tso, Tso moriri, the Indus Valley., Markha valley, Ladakh monastery trek, South Zangskar, Trans-Zangskar Expedition, Spiti to Ladakh, Spiti to Pitok to Hemis, Rupshu, the Great Salt lakes, Chadar Ice trek Other treks are Padum-Manali, Padum-Phuktal, Padam-Darcha, Panikhar-Heniskot, Lamayuru-Martselang, Lamayuru-Alchi, Kala Pattar trek, and Pahal, Ladakh.

In 2018, following 4 trails with night stay in Ladakh were opened for the tourists by the Go:
 Phyang-Dokla-Hunderdok track 
 Temisgam-Largyap-Panchathank-Skuru track 
 Basgo-Ney-Hunderdok-Hunder track 
 Saspol-Saspochy-Rakurala-Skuru track

Theme tourism

Buddhist tourism

Buddhist Monasteries

There are about 35 Buddhist monasteries along the banks of 
spread across the region which thrives on donations made by tourists and the local people of the region but now the government plans to develop these monasteries. The state government also plans to hire experts for landscaping of the barren regions and such a move was possible only after the Centre released funds.

About 65 km west of Leh, towards Zanskar river, is the village of Sumda Chun at height of 3500 mtr. The monastery of Sumda-Chun is one of the most important surviving early Tibetan Buddhist temples of the Ladakh region.

Bamiyan-like Maitreya Buddhas of Kargil district

The 1,400-year-old eight-metre high rock-cut Maitreya Buddhas (the Buddha who will be incarnated in the future) of Bamiyan Buddha statues were found carved in the cliffs in 3 different locations in Ladakh which predate Tibetan Buddhism, one at 20 km from Kargil at towards Batalik, another 40 km from Kargil at Mulbekh village on the bank of Suru River on the dirt road leading to Khartse Khar, and third is on the way to Zanskar. Since Taliban have already destroyed the Bamiyan Buddhas in Afghanistan, very few such relic remain, these ancient Buddha statues in Ladakh in India still survive. All 3 statues, locally called "chamba", likely belong to the same period as they resemble each other.

Khartse Khar Maitreya Buddha statue 

The 7 meter tall 7th-8th century "Khartse Khar Buddha statue" or "Khartse Khar Chamba" carved in greyish-yellow rock face on a cliff is 48 km from Kargil on Kargil-Sankoo-Barsoo road. Sankoo is 42 km from Kargil, then the Barsoo road further 4.6 km leads east to the statue on the road side in Khartse Khar village on the bank of Suru River. "The holes around it suggested that scaffolding had been used to reach the face and carve out the finer details. The Buddha formed an abhayamudrā (gesture of fearlessness) with his right hand, while the left hand carried a kamandal (pot to carry water). I noticed a rudraksha mala (prayer beads) tied around the wrist and the arm, as well as the janeu (sacred thread) and the karadhani (waist chain), also made out of rudraksha. Although knotted, the statue’s hair fell over his shoulders."

Mulbekh Maitreya Buddha statue 

The 9 meter tall "Mulbekh Maitreya Buddha statue" or "Mulbekh Chamba" in Gandhara art, dating back to 8th century CE Kushan period, at Mulbekh village 38 km Kargil from on Kargil-Leh NH1 highway is visible from the highway. A gompa at its feet was built in 1975. The statue has several arms which "carry leaves in one hand, a string of beads in another, a kamandal in a third, and pointed towards the earth with a fourth."

Apati Maitreya Buddha statue 

The "Apati Maitreya Buddha statue" or "Apati Chamba", on a cobbled pathway at Apati village is 16 to 22 km from Kargil on Kargil-Batalik road. Among the 3 statues in Kargil district, it is the shortest in size and nearest to Kargil town. It has a rudraksha necklace and carries the kamandal.

Cave art 

Saspol Caves, situated in the hills behind Saspol, is about 76 km from Leh, is one of the very few early period painted cave temples to exist in Ladakh and these paintings are dated to the 15th century CE. The caves, also known as Gon-Nila-Phuk Cave temples, are in danger of total collapse and were therefore listed in 2016 World Monuments Watch. Rammed earth fortification can be seen on top of the hill near the caves. has Paintings existing in five caves, two of them extensively damaged. One of the painted caves, that have been given a coat of lime wash and red paint in the exterior is the most visited and is considered as the main cave. Paintings of Anuttarayoga Tantra images of the main cave is very rare during the period of execution of these paintings. These caves are under the administration of Lekir Monastery.

Ecotourism

Due to the strain that tourism can cause on local resources, the concept of ecotourism has been introduced in Ladakh by non-governmental organizations and individuals like Helena Norberg-Hodge and Thinlas Chorol.

In May 2001, The Mountain Institute, Ladakh Ecological Development Group and Snow Leopard Conservancy organized a workshop on "Ecotourism Opportunities in Rural Ladakh" in the city of Leh in order to "increase awareness" and "explore opportunities for ecotourism".

Extreme adventure at Siachen Base Camp and Kumar Post 

India allows several tourist and civilian activities in Siachen area. To exploit the potential for tourism, the government is making ongoing efforts to improve connectivity. There is a recurring planned annual civilian expedition from Siachen Base Camp to Indira Ridge, Indira Col and other features. India has opened up the entire area from Siachen Base Camp at 12,000 ft to Kumar Post at 15,000 ft for the regular tourism for the civilians. Bana Post at 23,000 ft will remain off limit to tourists. Temperature drop to below minus 60 degrees Celsius during the winter.

Until 2010, civilian tourists were permitted only in the Nubra Valley up to Panamik. Since 2010 tourist have been permitted in Nubra Valley up to Turtuk and beyond to Tyakshi on LAC, both of these villages were captured from Pakistan by India in Indo-Pakistani War of 1971. From 2019, medically fit civilians below the age of 45 are allowed up to Kumar Base (16,000 ft) on a 30-day trek organised by Army Adventure Cell in August–September, during which tourists go through the highly altitude conditioning at Leh Base, Siachen Base and forward staging posts, at the end of which they undertake an extreme adventure 9-day return track from Siachen Base to Kumar Base 60 km away.

Festivals and events 

Following major festivals and events are celebrated:

 Galdan Namchot traditional festival
 Great Tibetan Marathon
 Ladakh International Film Festival
 Ladakh Marathon
 Losar new year festival
 Sindhu Darshan Festival, annual 3 day tourism festival at Leh in June

Rock art

Ladakh has several petroglyphs dating back 5000 years to Iron Age, Bronze Age, Kushan period (30–375 CE), and as recent as 15th century. "Rock art in Ladakh comprises carvings or incisions on rock surfaces that are called petroglyphs which display a very wide range of themes and motifs, and provide crucial information about Ladakh’s prehistory about which very little is yet known, The rock art of Ladakh, whilst concentrated around the Indus River and its tributaries, is represented in all parts of Ladakh and Kargil districts, including Zanskar, Changthang and Nubra. However, the rock art of Ladakh at several locations is under severe risk of damage and outright destruction though road, housing and other development projects, and we are confident that the establishment of RAU will play a key role with other interested organisations, to create local community level awareness and ownership of this precious cultural heritage."

French National Centre for Scientific Research (CNRS) has undertaken exploration since 2009 and have found several thousand rock paintings across more than 400 rock carving sites.

See also

 Tourism infrastructure
 Geography of Ladakh
 India-China Border Roads
 List of districts of Ladakh
 Siachen Base Camp (India) 
 Saspol Caves

 Borders
 Actual Ground Position Line (AGPL), India-Pakistan border across Siachen region
 Line of Actual Control (LAC), India-China border across Ladakh
 Line of Control (LoC), India-Pakistan border across Ladakh and Jammu and Kashmir

 Conflicts
 Sino-Indian War
 Indo-Pakistani wars and conflicts
 Siachen conflict
 Siachen Glacier

References

Further reading
Journal of tourist places in Ladakh

External links

Picture galleries: Monasteries, mountains and people
Ladakh tourist attractions guide